Rowing competitions at the 2012 Summer Paralympics in London were held from 31 August to 2 September 2012, at Dorney Lake which, for the purposes of the Games venue, is officially termed Eton Dorney.

Classification
Rowers are given a classification depending on the type and extent of their disability. The classification system allows rowers to compete against others with a similar level of function.

The three rowing classes are:
LTA (Legs, Trunk and Arms) - Mixed coxed fours
TA (Trunk and Arms) - Mixed double sculls
AS (Arms and shoulders) - Men's and women's singles

Events
Four rowing events are scheduled to be held, each over a course of 1000 metres:
Men's single sculls AS
Women's single sculls AS
Mixed double sculls TA
Mixed four coxed LTA

Participating nations
96 rowers (48 male, 48 female) from 23 nations including 12 coxswains (5 male, 7 female) from 12 nations took part in this sport.

Medalists

See also
Rowing at the 2012 Summer Olympics

References

External links
Official Site of the 2012 Summer Paralympics

 
2012
2012 Summer Paralympics events
Paralympics
Rowing competitions in the United Kingdom